Bago Daho is a village in the district Ghotki, Pakistan and the district's union council. It is located at 28.1130°N, 69.5246°E.

References

Villages in Ghotki District
Union councils of Sindh
Union councils of Ghotki District